GSE may refer to:

Commerce and finance 
 Ghana Stock Exchange
 Government-sponsored enterprise
 Guwahati Stock Exchange, in Assam, India

Education 
 Barcelona Graduate School of Economics
 Golden State Exams, in California, United States
 Stanford Graduate School of Education

Technology 
 Fiat Global Small Engine, a class of automobile engine
 Generic Stream Encapsulation, a networking protocol
 Generic Substation Events, a networking standard
 Ground support equipment
 GSE Systems, an American software developer
 XNA Game Studio Express, an integrated development environment

Other uses 
 Gaussian Symplectic ensemble
 General somatic efferent fibers
 Georgian Soviet Encyclopedia
 Georgian State Electrosystem
 Ghanaian Sign Language
 Gluten sensitive enteropathy
 Gothenburg City Airport, in Sweden
 Grape seed extract
 Grapefruit seed extract
 Great Soviet Encyclopedia
 Green Street Elite, a fictional football firm in the film Green Street
 Guvernanta Sonorilo Esperanto, an Esperanto club

See also

 GGSE (disambiguation)
 GES (disambiguation)
 EGS (disambiguation)
 ESG (disambiguation)
 SEG (disambiguation)
 SGE (disambiguation)